Jennifer "Jen" Metzger (born February 3, 1965) is an American politician serving as the County Executive of Ulster County, New York since 2023. She is a member of the Democratic Party (United States). She previously represented the 42nd district in the New York State Senate from 2019 to 2020, and served on the Rosendale town council from 2013 to 2018.

Background 
Metzger was born and raised in New York City. She graduated from Oberlin College in 1987 and earned her Ph.D. in political science from Rutgers University in 2004. She is married with three children.

In 1988, Metzger began work as a public affairs coordinator with the United Nations, and later served as an instructor at the Walt Whitman Center for Culture and Politics of Democracy and Rutgers University.

In 2001, Metzger and her husband moved to Rosendale, New York, a hamlet in the Hudson Valley. She later chaired the Rosendale environmental commission and served as deputy town supervisor. In 2013, Metzger was elected to the Rosendale Town Council. She was reelected in 2017.

Metzger founded the nonprofit organization Citizens for Local Power, which organized dozens of town and city councils across the country.

New York State Senate 
In February 2018, Metzger announced that she would challenge longtime Republican Senator John Bonacic for his seat. Several months later, Bonacic announced that he would retire. In September, Metzger defeated Pramilla Malick in the Democratic primary. She faced Orange County Clerk Annie Rabbitt in the general election. Metzger defeated Rabbitt 52% to 48%.

Metzger was named Chair of the Senate Agriculture Committee. In 2019, she voted for the Green Light Law, which allowed undocumented immigrants to obtain driver licenses. She also voted for a law that ended cash bail in New York, but later proposed revisions to that law. Metzger was the lead sponsor of the "Boss Bill", a 2019-passed law that bars employers from taking employees' reproductive health choices into account when making employment decisions. She introduced a bill that, if passed, would codify New York's existing ban on hydraulic fracking, as well as a constitutional amendment to bar the inclusion of non-budgetary legislation in the New York state budget. She is a supporter of a single-payer health insurance system.

In 2020, Metzger lost her re-election bid to Republican Mike Martucci.

References

External links

Living people
1965 births
People from Rosendale, New York
Oberlin College alumni
Rutgers University alumni
Democratic Party New York (state) state senators
Women state legislators in New York (state)
21st-century American politicians
21st-century American women politicians